Sand Star was a  dredger that was built in 1943 as the coaster Empire Dyke Clelands (Successors) Ltd, Wallsend, Northumberland, United Kingdom for the Ministry of War Transport (MoWT). She was transferred to the Netherlands in 1943 and renamed Prinses Margriet. In 1954, she was sold to the United Kingdom and renamed Sand Star. She served until 1966 when she sank following a collision.

Description
The ship was built in 1942 by Clelands (Successors) Ltd, Wallsend, Northumberland. She was yard number 56.

The ship was propelled by a 116 nhp two-stroke Single Cycle, Single Action diesel engine, which had six cylinders of  diameter by  stroke driving a single screw propeller. The engine was built by Crossley Bros Ltd, Leeds, Yorkshire.

History
Empire Dyke was built in 1943 by Clelands (Successors) Ltd, Wallsend, Northumberland, for the MoWT. She was completed in April. The United Kingdom Official Number 165828 and Code Letters BDTK were allocated. Her port of registry was Newcastle upon Tyne and she was placed under the management of G Gibson & Co Ltd. Little is known of her wartime service, although she was a member of Convoy FN 808, which departed from Southend, Essex on 8 September 1942 and arrived at Methil, Fife two days later.

In 1943, Empire Dyke was transferred to the Dutch Government and renamed Prinses Margriet. She was placed under the management of the Netherland Shipping & Trading Committee Ltd. In June and July 1944, Prinses Margriet was employed around the south coast of the United Kingdom, sailing in various ETC and FTC convoys.

In 1954, Prinses Margriet was sold to South Coast Shipping Co Ltd and renamed Sand Star. She was placed under the management of Burness Shipping Co Ltd. In 1955, Sand Star was converted to a dredger. Management passed to Wm Cory & Sons Ltd in 1956. On 4 March 1966, Sand Star collided with the  coaster  in Southampton Water and sank. All eight crew were rescued by Caroline M. She was raised in May and scrapped in September at Thos. W. Ward Grays, Essex.

References

1942 ships
Ships built on the River Tyne
Empire ships
Ministry of War Transport ships
Steamships of the Netherlands
World War II merchant ships of the Netherlands
Merchant ships of the Netherlands
Merchant ships of the United Kingdom
Dredgers
Maritime incidents in 1966
Ships sunk in collisions
Ships sunk with no fatalities